The Philippine House Special Committee on Reforestation is a special committee of the Philippine House of Representatives.

Jurisdiction 
As prescribed by House Rules, the committee's jurisdiction is on the policies and programs on reforestation which includes the effects of forest denudation, and other actions to ensure the implementation of a sustained community-based nationwide reforestation program.

Members, 18th Congress

See also 
 House of Representatives of the Philippines
 List of Philippine House of Representatives committees

References

External links 
House of Representatives of the Philippines

Reforestation